Ville Paumola (born 16 March 1991) is a snowboarder from Finland. He won a bronze medal at the 2011 FIS Snowboarding World Championships in the slopestyle event.

He competed at the 2014 Winter Olympics in Sochi, Russia placing 19th in the Men's Slopestyle Snowboarding semi-final.

References

External links
 FIS-Ski.com – Biography

1991 births
Living people
Finnish male snowboarders
Snowboarders at the 2014 Winter Olympics
Olympic snowboarders of Finland
People from Ylöjärvi
Sportspeople from Pirkanmaa